Thrash was an unincorporated community in Braxton County, West Virginia, United States. Its post office  is closed.

References

Unincorporated communities in Braxton County, West Virginia
Unincorporated communities in West Virginia